The Walter Camp Player of the Year Award is given annually to the collegiate American football player of the year, as decided by a group of National Collegiate Athletic Association (NCAA) Division I FBS head coaches and sports information directors under the auspices of the Walter Camp Football Foundation; the award is named for Walter Camp, an important and influential figure in the development of the sport. Three players have won the award twice: Colt McCoy of the University of Texas in  2008 and 2009, Archie Griffin of Ohio State in 1974 and 1975, and O. J. Simpson of USC in 1967 and 1968.

Winners

Awards won by school 
This is a list of the schools that have had a player win the Walter Camp Award.  USC has the most award winners, with seven. In total, players from 22 different schools have won the Walter Camp Award.

*Designates double award winner

References
General
 

Footnotes

External links
Awards webpage. Walter Camp Football Foundation official website

College football national player awards
Awards established in 1967